Chandnakiyari  is a suburb in Bokaro, Jharkhand, India. It is a village in the Chandankiyari CD block in the Chas subdivision of the Bokaro district in the Indian state of Jharkhand. It is planned to be a part of Greater Bokaro. It is also a major industrial hub and houses several companies of Bokaro. It is under the region of Chas municipal corproration.

Geography

Location

Area overview
Bokaro district consists of undulating uplands on the Chota Nagpur Plateau with the Damodar River cutting a valley right across. The East Bokaro Coalfield located in the Bermo-Phusro area and small intrusions of Jharia Coalfield make Bokaro a coal rich district. In 1965, one of the largest steel manufacturing units in the country, Bokaro Steel Plant, operated by Steel Authority of India Limited, was set-up at Bokaro Steel City. The Damodar Valley Corporation established its first thermal power station at Bokaro (Thermal). The soil is generally infertile and agriculture is mostly rain-fed.

Note: The map alongside presents some of the notable locations in the district. All places marked in the map are linked in the larger full screen map.

Civic administration

Police station
Chandankiyari has a police station.

CD block HQ
The headquarters of Chandankiyari CD block are located at Chandankiyari.

Demographics
According to the 2011 Census of India Chandankiyari had a total population of 9,836, of which 5,127 (52%) were males and 4,709 (48%) were females. Population in the age range 0-6 years was 1,486. The total number of literate persons in Chandankiyari was 5,767 (84.89% of the population over 6 years).

Transport
The Raghunathpur-Chandankiyari Road meets State Highway 12 (Jharkhand) at Chandankiyari.

References

Villages in Bokaro district